The 2022–23 season is Reading's 152nd year in existence and tenth consecutive season in the Championship, and covers the period from 1 July 2022 to 30 June 2023.

Season review

Pre-season
On 16 May, Paul Ince was confirmed as Reading's permanent manager, with Mark Bowen also returning to the club as Head of Football Operations.

On 26 May, West Bromwich Albion announced the signing of John Swift.

On 30 May, Reading confirmed that the squad would return for pre-season training on 20 June, with the squad spending a week training at St George's Park National Football Centre before taking part in a series of pre-season friendlies. The following day, 31 May, Reading announced their first pre-season friendly, a trip to Plough Lane to face AFC Wimbledon on 14 July.

On 6 June, Reading announced that they would end their week-long training camp at St George's Park National Football Centre, with a behind-closed-doors friendly against Benfica.

On 8 June, Reading announced a home friendly against West Ham United at the Select Car Leasing Stadium on 16 July, and a behind-closed-doors friendly against Maidenhead United on 12 July at their Bearwood Park training ground.

On 15 June, Reading announced a friendly against Brighton & Hove Albion was announced the same day, to be played at 3pm, 23 July at the Select Car Leasing Stadium, whilst a behind-closed-doors friendly against Colchester United was also announced for 2 July.

On 21 June, Stoke City announced the signing of Josh Laurent.

On 23 June, the EFL Championship scheduled was released for the season, with Reading starting their season with an away trip to Blackpool on 30 July and ending the season with an away trip to Huddersfield Town on 6 May 2023. The following day, Cardiff City announced the signing of Andy Rinomhota.

On 8 July, Reading confirmed that Andy Yiadom had been appointed as the clubs new Club Captain.

Transfers and contracts
On 20 May, Reading confirmed that they had offered new contracts to Tom Holmes, Josh Laurent, Andy Rinomhota, Femi Azeez and Andy Yiadom, whilst also confirming the departure of loanees Danny Drinkwater, Tom Dele-Bashiru, Baba Rahman, Tom Ince and Karl Hein. Additionally the club confirmed that Terell Thomas, Brandon Barker, Ørjan Nyland, Felipe Araruna, Alen Halilović and Marc McNulty would leave the club upon the expiry of their contract at the end of June and the contract discussions where on going with Junior Hoilett, Michael Morrison and John Swift. Reading also offered new professional contracts to under-23 players Nelson Abbey, Jeriel Dorsett, Imari Samuels, Claudio Osorio, Kian Leavy, Rashawn Scott, Kelvin Ehibhatiomhan and Nahum Melvin-Lambert, and to under-18 players Mamadi Camara, Jahmari Clarke, Tyrell Ashcroft and Louie Holzman. Pro terms where also offered to Hamid Abdel Salam, Sam Paul, Matthew Rowley and Benjamin Purcell, with Ajani Giscombe, Harvey Maudner and David Nyarko also having their contracts extended for an additional year. The club also confirmed the departure of Ethan Bristow, James Holden, Lynford Sackey and Malachi Talent-Aryeetey while Jordan Addo-Antoine.

On 15 June, the EFL released the Retained List for each club, which confirmed contract renewals for Jahmari Clarke, Tyrell Ashcroft, Louie Holzman, Harvey Collins, Hamid Abdel-Salam, Sam Paul, Matt Rowley, Benjamin Purcell, Jeriel Dorsett and Kian Leavy.

On 17 June, Tom Holmes and Andy Yiadom both signed a new three-year contracts with Reading.

On 19 June, Reading announced their first signing of the summer, with Joe Lumley signing on loan from Middlesbrough for the season. The following day, 20 June, during a pre-season interview with him, Reading confirmed that they had triggered a clause in Jeriel Dorsett's contract that would extend his stay with Reading until the summer of 2023.

On 21 June, Reading announced the signing of Tom Ince to a three-year contract beginning 1 July once his Stoke City contract expires.

On 22 June, Reading announced the signings of Michael Craig and John Clarke to the U23 team, whilst confirming new contracts had been signed with Michael Stickland, Louie Holzman, Kian Leavy and Jeriel Dorsett.

On 24 June, Reading announced that Mamadi Camará, Rashawn Scott, Nelson Abbey, Matt Rowley, Sam Paul, Benjamin Purcell and Claudio Osorio had all signed new contracts with the club for the 2022-23 season.

On 27 June, Reading announced the signing of Dean Bouzanis from Sutton United to a three-year contract.

On 1 July, Tottenham Hotspur announced that Tyrell Ashcroft had joined their academy.

On 2 July, Reading confirmed that Femi Azeez had signed a new contract with the club until the summer 2024, whilst Nahum Melvin-Lambert and Hamid Abdel Salam had also both signed new contract with the club for the 2022–23 season.

On 5 July, Reading confirmed that both Junior Hoilett and Kelvin Ehibhatiomhan had signed new contracts with Reading, Hoilett until the summer of 2023 and Ehibhatiomhan the summer of 2024.

On 7 July, Reading confirmed that Jahmari Clarke had signed a new contract with the club. The following day, 8 July, Reading announced the signing of Tyrese Fornah on a season-long loan deal from Nottingham Forest.

On 12 July, Reading announced the season-long loan signing of Jeff Hendrick from Newcastle United. The following day, 13 July, Reading announced the return of Shane Long on a one-year contract after he'd left Southampton earlier in the summer.

On 20 July, Reading announced the signing of Sam Hutchinson to a two-year contract, after he'd impressed on trial following the expiration of his Sheffield Wednesday contract at the end of June 2022. The following day, 21 July, Tom Holmes was confirmed as Readings Vice-Captain for the season, behind Captain Andy Yiadom.

On 22 July, Luke Southwood joined Cheltenham Town on a season-long loan deal.

On 29 July, Reading announced the signing of Nesta Guinness-Walker to a one-year contract after impressing on trial following the expiration of his AFC Wimbledon contract at the end of the previous season. Later the same day, Reading announced the signing of Mamadou Loum on a season-long loan deal from Porto.

July
Reading started the season with an away match against Blackpool, where an early goal from Callum Connolly gave the hosts all three points.

August
On 5 August, Jeriel Dorsett joined Kilmarnock on a season-long loan deal. The following day, 6 August, Reading hosted Cardiff City at the Select Car Leasing Stadium. Reading went behind in the 4th minute after Callum O'Dowda netted for the visitors, but then a penalty in the 27th minute from Shane Long saw the teams even at the break. In the second half a strike from Tom Ince secured all three points for Reading. 

On 19 August, Reading announced that Ayyuba Jambang, Ethan Burnett, Josh Green and Adrian Akande had all joined the U21s set up.

On 25 August, Reading confirmed that George Pușcaș had joined Genoa on a season-long loan deal. The following day, 26 August, Reading announced the signing of Naby Sarr to a four-year contract after a successful trial period.

On 31 August, Reading confirmed the return of Baba Rahman on loan from Chelsea for the season.

September
On 8 September, manager Paul Ince was nominated for EFL Championship Manager of the Month for August.

On 9 September, Readings away trip to Watford, scheduled for 10 September, was postponed after the EFL postponed all football fixtures from 9 – 11 September as a mark of respect following the death of Elizabeth II the previous day.

On 12 September, Reading announced that Nahum Melvin-Lambert had signed for Hemel Hempstead Town on a one-month youth loan deal. Later the same day, Reading confirmed that their postponed match against Watford from 9 September, would now be played at 19:45 on 8 November.

On 13 September, Reading confirmed the singing of Amadou Mbengue on a short-term contract until January 2023 after training with the club since leaving Metz during the summer and that Abraham Kanu had also signed his first professional club with the club. The following day, 14 September, Ethan Burnett joined Havant & Waterlooville on loan until January 2023. On 15 September, Andy Carroll returned to the club, signing a 4-month contract with the club, until January 2023.

On 30 September, Reading announced the signing of Lui Bradbury on a free transfer to their Under-21 set-up, after he'd left Leeds United during the summer, whilst Benjamin Purcell joined Hartley Wintney on a one-month loan deal and David Nyarko joined Thatcham Town on a month-long work experience placement.

October
On 29 October, Reading announced that Jahmari Clarke had joined Woking on a month-long youth loan deal.

December
On 14 December, Reading recalled Benjamin Purcell from his loan with Hartley Wintney, and immediately loaned him to Farnborough.

January
On 10 January, Andy Carroll signed a contract extension with Reading, keeping at the club until the summer of 2024.

On 13 January, Reading announced that Amadou Mbengue had extended his contract with the club until the end of the season, with a view to a further extension.

On 24 January, Jökull Andrésson returned to Exeter City on an emergency-loan deal, and Ben Purcell extended his loan deal at Farnborough for an additional month.

On 30 January, Reading announced the signing of Cesare Casadei from Chelsea on loan for the remainder of the season.

On 31 January, after his emergency-loan to Exeter City ended, Jökull Andrésson joined Stevenage on loan for the remainder of the season. On the same day, Jahmari Clarke joined Forest Green Rovers on loan for the remainder of the season.

February
On 3 February, Nahum Melvin-Lambert joined Weymouth on a one-month loan deal, with David Nyarko joining him at Weymouth on a work experience deal.

On 8 February, Kian Leavy joined Shelbourne on loan until the summer transfer window.

On 15 February, Reading announced the signing of Matthew Carson following a successful trial, and Benjamin Purcell was recalled from his loan deal with Farnborough.

On 21 February, Matt Rowley joined Bognor Regis Town on loan until 23 April.

On 22 February, Benjamin Purcell joined Kingstonian on loan for the remainder of the season, whilst Claudio Osorio joined Cobh Ramblers on loan until the end of June.

March
On 1 March, there were reports that the team were facing another six-point deduction for breaching profitability and sustainability rules.

Transfers

For those players released or contract ended before the start of this season, see 2021–22 Reading F.C. season.

In

 Transfers announced on the above date, but was not finalised until 1 July 2022 as free agents.

Loans in

Loans out

Trial

Squad

Out on loan

Friendlies

Competitions

Overview

Championship

On 23 June, the EFL Championship scheduled was released for the season, with Reading starting their season with an away trip to Blackpool on 30 July and ending the season with an away trip to Huddersfield Town on 6 May 2023.

League table

Results summary

Results by matchday

Results

EFL Cup

FA Cup

Squad statistics

Appearances and goals

|-
|colspan="14"|Players away on loan:

|-
|colspan="14"|Players who appeared for Reading but left during the season:
|}

Goal scorers

Clean sheets

Disciplinary record

References

Match reports 

Reading
Reading F.C. seasons
English football clubs 2022–23 season